Invasion is a 1997 miniseries based on the novel of the same name by Robin Cook. It starred Luke Perry, Kim Cattrall and Rebecca Gayheart.

Plot
Small rocks fall from the sky which, when touched, trigger a latent virus that has always existed in humans and begins mutating them into an alien species. Taking advantage of its hive mentality, the aliens are absolutely dedicated to transforming every human on Earth and do so with alarming swiftness. Only a small group of remaining humans have the medical knowledge to devise antibodies to reverse the effects of the virus.

Cast 
 Luke Perry : Beau Stark
 Kim Cattrall : Dr. Sheila Moran
 Rebecca Gayheart : Cassy Winthrope
 Christopher Orr : Pitt Henderson
 Jon Polito : Detective Kemper
 Neal McDonough : Randy North
 Rosanna DeSoto : Nancy Ochoa 
 Cástulo Guerra : Eugene Ochoa
 Michael Warren : Dr. Harlan McCoy
 Chuck McCann : chairman of health committee
 Tim DeKay : Mike Landry
 Jason Schombing : Assistant Detective 
 John Finn : Colonel Brown (non credited)

Awards 
 Saturn Award 
 Saturn Award for best TV series 1998
 ALMA Awards 
 Motion Picture Sound Editors 
 Best Sound Editing in a TV movie 1998

External links 

 

1997 films
1997 television films
1990s science fiction films
1990s American television miniseries
Films scored by Don Davis (composer)
Films about viral outbreaks
Films about extraterrestrial life
Films directed by Armand Mastroianni
American science fiction television films
1990s American films